Mount Harmston is a mountain on Vancouver Island, British Columbia, Canada, located approximately  southwest of Courtenay and  north of The Red Pillar.

Mount Harmston is part of the Vancouver Island Ranges which in turn form part of the Insular Mountains.

History
Mount Harmston is named after the Harmston family, early settlers of the Comox Valley.  They settled on a 200+ acre preemption in early December 1862, coming from Lincolnshire, England.

See also
List of mountains in Strathcona Provincial Park
List of mountains of Canada

References

Vancouver Island Ranges
Two-thousanders of British Columbia
Clayoquot Land District